Florencio Varela is a city in Buenos Aires Province, Argentina. It is the administrative centre for Florencio Varela Partido. It forms part of the urban agglomeration of Greater Buenos Aires.

The settlement was officially founded on 30 January 1891 by Juan de la Cruz Contreras. It is named after Argentine writer and journalist Florencio Varela.

External links

Populated places in Buenos Aires Province
Populated places established in 1891
Florencio Varela Partido
1891 establishments in Argentina
Cities in Argentina
Argentina